Portinho may refer to:

People
 Carlos Portinho (born 1973), Brazilian politician and lawyer
 Carmen Portinho (1903-2001), Brazilian civil engineer, urbanist and feminist

Places
 Portinho, São Tomé and Príncipe
 , Portugal